Mispila impuncticollis is a species of beetle in the family Cerambycidae, native to New Guinea. It was described by Stephan von Breuning in 1966.

References

impuncticollis
Beetles described in 1966